Teodor Marinov Skorchev (born 4 September 1986) is a Bulgarian footballer who plays as a goalkeeper.

Honours

Club
 Beroe
Bulgarian Cup (2): 2009-10, 2012–13

External links
 

1986 births
Living people
Bulgarian footballers
First Professional Football League (Bulgaria) players
Association football goalkeepers
FC Maritsa Plovdiv players
PFC Beroe Stara Zagora players
PFC Lokomotiv Plovdiv players